John Stewart of Traquair (died 1591) was a Scottish landowner.

He was a son of William Stewart of Traquair and Christian Hay. He was a younger brother of Robert Stewart of Traquair, from whom he inherited the family estates.

A young laird of Traquair, possibly Robert Stewart, was shot at the siege of Haddington in August 1548.

His home was Traquair House at Innerleithen. Stewart was a Protestant and supported the Scottish Reformation.

In December 1562 Mary, Queen of Scots sent Adam MacCulloch, Marchmont Herald, to Hermitage Castle, demanding its surrender to John Stewart of Traquair.

Stewart was Captain of the Royal Guard of Mary, Queen of Scots and Lord Darnley. He is said to have accompanied them on their ride to Seton Palace and Dunbar Castle with Arthur Erskine of Blackgrange after the murder of David Rizzio.

He was engaged in a feud with his kinsman William Hay, 6th Lord Hay of Yester in 1587, and Hay was imprisoned in Edinburgh Castle.

John Stewart married Jonet Ker. They had children.

John Stewart died on 18 April 1591.

In 1591 William Stewart of Caverston, his younger brother, inherited the Traquair lands, and after his death Traquair went to another brother, James Stewart. His son, John Stewart, married Margaret Stewart, a daughter of Margaret Stewart, Mistress of Ochiltree. Their son was John Stewart, 1st Earl of Traquair.

References

16th-century Scottish people
Court of Mary, Queen of Scots
1591 deaths